Mesadenus is a genus of flowering plants from the orchid family, Orchidaceae. It contains 6 currently recognized species, native to Mexico, Central America, the West Indies, Brazil and Florida.

Mesadenus chiangii (M.C.Johnst.) Garay - Coahuila
Mesadenus glaziovii (Cogn.) Schltr. - Rio de Janeiro
Mesadenus lucayanus (Britton) Schltr. - widespread across Mexico, Florida, Guatemala, West Indies
Mesadenus polyanthus (Rchb.f.) Schltr. - Mexico, Belize
Mesadenus rhombiglossus (Pabst) Garay - Minas Gerais
Mesadenus tenuissimus (L.O.Williams) Garay - Morelos

See also 
 List of Orchidaceae genera

References 

 Pridgeon, A.M., Cribb, P.J., Chase, M.A. & Rasmussen, F. eds. (1999). Genera Orchidacearum 1. Oxford Univ. Press.
 Pridgeon, A.M., Cribb, P.J., Chase, M.A. & Rasmussen, F. eds. (2001). Genera Orchidacearum 2. Oxford Univ. Press.
 Pridgeon, A.M., Cribb, P.J., Chase, M.A. & Rasmussen, F. eds. (2003). Genera Orchidacearum 3. Oxford Univ. Press
 Berg Pana, H. 2005. Handbuch der Orchideen-Namen. Dictionary of Orchid Names. Dizionario dei nomi delle orchidee. Ulmer, Stuttgart

External links 

Cranichideae genera
Spiranthinae